Thomas Dermot Utley (born 29 November 1952) is a British journalist who writes for the Daily Mail.

Life and career
Utley is the son of the journalist T. E. ('Peter') Utley and Brigid Viola Mary (1927–2012), daughter of Dermot Morrah, a journalist, Fellow of All Souls College, Oxford, and Arundel Herald Extraordinary at the College of Arms.

He wrote for The Daily Telegraph, where he was described by The Independent as a "star Telegraph columnist", but left in early 2006 after being offered a salary of £120,000 by the Daily Mail. He has made a career out of opposing 'wokery' (i.e. related to woke).

Personal life
Utley is a Roman Catholic.

His niece Olivia Utley is Assistant Comment Editor for The Daily Telegraph.

References 

1953 births
Living people
English male journalists
English Roman Catholics
People educated at Westminster School, London
Alumni of Corpus Christi College, Cambridge
Daily Mail journalists